Crumlin railway station may refer to:

Crumlin railway station (Wales)
Crumlin railway station (Northern Ireland)